The Kepler-Gymnasium is one of seven gymnasiums in Ulm. A special feature of the Kepler-Gymnasium is its art program, which can be attended from the 5th grade.

Student life
The school's newspaper is the Kepler Kessel.

Notable people

External links 

 Official website

References 

Gymnasiums in Germany